Emotional and behavioral disorders (EBD; also known as behavioral and emotional disorders) refer to a disability classification used in educational settings that allows educational institutions to provide special education and related services to students who have displayed poor social and/or academic progress.

The classification is often given to students after conducting a Functional Behavior Analysis. These students need individualized behavior supports such as a Behavior Intervention Plan, to receive a free and appropriate public education. Students with EBD may be eligible for an Individualized Education Plan (IEP) and/or accommodations in the classroom through a 504 Plan.

History

Early history 
Before any studies were done on the subject, mental illnesses were often thought to be a form of demonic possession or witchcraft. Since much was unknown, there was little to no distinction between the different types of mental illness and developmental disorders that we refer to today. Most often, they were dealt with by performing an exorcism on the person exhibiting signs of any mental illness. In the early to mid 1800s, asylums were introduced to America and Europe. There, patients were treated cruelly and often referred to as lunatics by the doctors in the professional fields. The main focus of asylums were to shun people with mental illnesses from the public. In 1963, the Community Mental Health Centers Construction Act (Public Law 88–164), was passed by Congress and signed by John F. Kennedy, which provided federal funding to community mental health centers. This legislation changed the way that mental health services were handled and also led to the closure of many large asylums. Many laws soon followed assisting more and more people with EBDs. 1978 came with the passing of Public Law 94- 142 which required free and public education to all disabled children including those with EBDs. An extension of PL 94–142, PL 99-457, was put into act which would provide services to all disabled children from the ages of 3-5 by the 1990–91 school year. PL 94-142 has since been renamed to the Individuals with Disabilities Education Act (IDEA).

Use and development of the term 
Various terms have been used to describe irregular emotional and behavioral disorders. Many of the terms such as mental illness and psychopathology were used to describe adults with such conditions. Mental illness was a label for most people with any type of disorder and it was common for people with emotional and behavioral disorders to be labeled with a mental illness. However, those terms were avoided when describing children as it seemed too stigmatizing. In the late 1900s the term "behaviorally disordered" appeared. Some professionals in the field of special education accepted the term while others felt it ignored emotional issues. In order to make a more uniformed terminology, the National Mental Health and Special Education Coalition, which consists of over thirty professional and advocacy groups, coined the term "emotional and behavioral disorders" in 1988.

Criteria

According to the Individuals with Disabilities Education Act an EBD classification is required if one or more of the following characteristics is excessively observed in a student over a significant amount of time:

 Learning challenges that cannot be explained by intellectual, sensory, or health factors.
 Trouble keeping up or building satisfactory relationships with peers and teachers.
 Inappropriate behavior (against self or others) or emotions (shares the need to harm others or self, low self-worth) in normal conditions.
 An overall attitude of unhappiness or depression.
 A tendency to develop physical symptoms or fears related with individual or school issues.

The term "EBD" includes students diagnosed with schizophrenia. However, it does not have any significant bearing on students who are socially maladjusted unless they also meet the above criteria.

Criticisms
Providing or failing to provide an EBD classification to a student may be controversial, as the IDEA does not clarify which children would be considered "socially maladjusted". Students with a psychiatric diagnosis of conduct disorder are not guaranteed to receive additional educational services under an EBD classification. Students with an EBD classification who meet the diagnostic criteria for various disruptive behavior disorders, including attention-deficit hyperactivity disorder (ADHD), oppositional defiant disorder (ODD), or conduct disorder (CD) do not have an automatic eligibility to receive an IEP or 504 Plan. Students considered "socially maladjusted", but ineligible for an EBD classification (i.e., students diagnosed with conduct disorder), often receive better educational services in special education classrooms or alternative schools with high structure, clear rules, and consistent consequences.

Student characteristics
Students with EBD are a diverse population with a wide range of intellectual and academic abilities. Males, African-Americans, and economically disadvantaged students are over-represented in the EBD population, and students with EBD are more likely to live in single-parent homes, foster homes, or other non-traditional living situations. These students also tend to have low rates of positive social interactions with peers in educational contexts. Students with EBD are often categorized as "internalizers" (e.g., have poor self-esteem, or are diagnosed with an anxiety disorder or mood disorder) or "externalizers" (e.g., disrupt classroom instruction, or are diagnosed with disruptive behavior disorders such as oppositional defiant disorder and conduct disorder). Male students may be over-represented in the EBD population because they appear to be more likely to exhibit disruptive externalizing behavior that interferes with classroom instruction. Females may be more likely to exhibit internalizing behavior that does not interfere with classroom instruction, though to what extent this perception is due to social expectations of differences in male and female behavior is unclear. In any case, it is important to note that both internalizing and externalizing behaviour can and do occur in either sex; Students with EBD are also at an increased risk for learning disabilities, school dropout, substance abuse, and juvenile delinquency.

Internalizing and externalizing behavior
A person with EBD with "internalizing" behavior may have poor self-esteem, have depression, experience loss of interest in social, academic, and other life activities, and may exhibit non-suicidal self-injury or substance abuse. Students with internalizing behavior may also have a diagnosis of separation anxiety or another anxiety disorder, post-traumatic stress disorder (PTSD), specific or social phobia, obsessive–compulsive disorder (OCD), panic disorder, and/or an eating disorder. Teachers are more likely to write referrals for students that are overly disruptive. Screening tools used to detect students with high levels of "internalizing" behavior are not sensitive and are rarely used in practice. Students with EBD with "externalizing" behavior may be aggressive, non-compliant, extroverted, or disruptive.

Students with EBD that show externalizing behavior are often diagnosed with attention deficit hyperactivity disorder (ADHD), oppositional defiant disorder (ODD), conduct disorder, and/or bipolar disorder; however, this population can also include typically developing children that have learned to exhibit externalizing behavior for various reasons (e.g., escape from academic demands or access to attention). These students often have difficulty inhibiting emotional responses resulting from anger, frustration, and disappointment. Students who "externalize" exhibit behaviors such as insulting, provoking, threatening, bullying, cursing, and fighting, along with other forms of aggression. Male students with EBD exhibit externalizing behavior more often than their female counterparts.

Children and adolescents with ADD or ADHD may display different types of externalizing behavior and should be either medicated or going through behavioral treatment for their diagnosis. Adolescents with severe ADHD would likely benefit most from both medication and behavioral treatment. Younger children should go through behavioral treatment before being treated with medication. Another recommended form of treatment for children and adolescents diagnosed with ADHD would be counseling from a mental health professional. Treatment options will improve performance of children and adolescents on emotion recognition tasks, specifically response time as there is no difficulty recognizing human emotions. The degree of required treatments vary depending on the degree of ADD or ADHD the individual has.

Treatment for these types of behaviors should include the parents as it is evident that their parenting skills impact on how their child deals with their symptoms, especially when at a younger age. Parents going through a parenting skills training program were reported a decrease in internalizing and externalizing behavior in their children post-training program. The program included learning how to give positive attention, increase good behavior with small frequent rewards and specific praise as well as learning how to decrease attention when the child behaved poorly.

Effect on cognition
In recent years, many researchers have been interested in exploring the relationship between emotional disorders and cognition. Evidence has revealed that there is a relationship between the two. Strauman (1989) investigated how emotional disorders shape a person's cognitive structure, that is, the mental processes people utilize to make sense of the world around them. He recruited three groups of individuals: those with social phobias, those with depression, and controls with no emotional disorder diagnosis. He wanted to determine whether these groups had a cognitive structure showing an actual/ideal (AI) discrepancy (referring to an individual not believing that they have achieved their personal desires) or actual/own/other (AOO) discrepancy (referring to an individual's actions not living up to what their significant other believes that they need to be). He found that depressed individuals had the highest AI discrepancy and social phobics had the greatest AOO discrepancy, while the controls were lower or in between the two for both discrepancies.

Specific cognitive processes (e.g., attention) may be different in those with emotional disorders. MacLeod, Mathews, and Tata (1986) tested the reaction times of 32 participants, some of whom were diagnosed with Generalized Anxiety disorder, when presented with threatening words. They found that when threatening words were presented, people with greater anxiety tended to have increased selective attention, meaning that they reacted quicker to a stimulus in an area where a threatening word was just presented (32-59ms faster). When in the control group, subjects reacted slower when there was a threatening word proceeding the stimulus (16-32ms slower).

Emotional disorders can also alter the way people regulate their emotions. Joormann and Gotlib (2010) conducted a study with depressed, or previously depressed, individuals to test this. They found that, when compared to individuals who have never had a depressive episode, previously and currently depressed individuals tended to use maladaptive emotion regulation strategies (such as rumination or brooding) more. They also found that when depressed individuals displayed cognitive inhibition (slowing of response to a variable that had been previously ignored) when asked to describe a negative word (ignored variable was a positive word), they were less likely to ruminate or brood. When they displayed cognitive inhibition when asked to describe a positive word (ignored variable was a negative word), they were more likely to reflect.

Services in the United States 
There are many types of services available to EBD students, referenced below. One service is one-on-one support (or an aide) who assists in everyday activities and academics. Another service is foundations offer behavior services as well as counseling support. Some services include classrooms that are dedicated to educational foundations and work on building the student up possessively. States also offer dedicated schools with multiple resources that help students with EBD excel and transition (back) into local schools.

Texas 
The state of Texas has the Texas Behavior Support Initiative (TBSI) authorized by Senate Bill 1196 and Texas Administrative Code §89.1053. With its design to provide knowledge for the use of constructive behavior interventions and to aid students, including students with disabilities. TBSI meets the legislative requirements for the use of restraint and time-out, along with providing the baseline work for behavior strategies and prevention throughout each environment.

New York 
The state of New York has the Foundations Behavioral Health that has been approved out of state educations and residential provider with the New York State Education Dept. Foundations offer Academic and Behavioral Health Services to students between the ages of 14–21. This program allows students educational experience to have strategic interventions to aid their social and behavioral functioning. Some of the program's highlights include Functional Behavioral Assessment (FBA), Behavioral Intervention Plan (BIP) & Community Based Instruction (CBI).

California 
The state of California has Spectrum Center classrooms in Los Angeles and the San Francisco area which are providing Emotional Disabilities and Behavioral Services. They provide academic classrooms for students who are actively working to improve grade-level standards and working toward getting their high school diploma.  The main practice is the use of Positive Behavior Interventions and Supports (PBIS). PBIS instructional practices help students determine their skill level and progress, restore their skills through direct instruction, knowing the standards on their grade level and small group counseling.

Michigan 
The state of Michigan has a Behavioral Education Center (BEC) in Bangor. Its purpose is to aid local schools directs with students between the ages of 5–26 years old with EBD's. Along with having students use appropriate behaviors and skills to successfully return to their local school setting. Classroom programs, consultation, coaching, and professional development services are available within the school districts.

Florida 
The state of Florida has Students with Emotional/Behavioral Disabilities Network (SEDNET). SEDNET projects across the state aid the local school districts to work with those at-risk of EBD's. “Dealing with adverse behavior in the educational environment,”  it serves students who poorly function at home, school, or community due to drugs and substance abuse or mental health issues. SEDNET 2A Services: Family Services Planning Team (FSPT)- agencies, school officials and SEDNET meet with parents to assist and aid the child's poor performance at school and home. Positive Behavior Support providing technical assistance to promote positive behavior. Classroom Observation/Teacher Consultation- working with EBD children using successful strategies and tips in a classroom environment.

References

External links 
 
 Behaviour Management (EBD) Review Group: Published reviews

School and classroom behaviour
Special education
Disability by type
Mental disorders diagnosed in childhood
Emotional issues